Syndecan 1 is a protein which in humans is encoded by the SDC1 gene.  The protein is a transmembrane (type I) heparan sulfate proteoglycan and is a member of the syndecan proteoglycan family. The syndecan-1 protein functions as an integral membrane protein and participates in cell proliferation, cell migration and cell-matrix interactions via its receptor for extracellular matrix proteins. Syndecan-1 is a sponge for growth factors and chemokines, with binding largely via heparan sulfate chains. The syndecans mediate cell binding, cell signaling, and cytoskeletal organization and syndecan receptors are required for internalization of the  HIV-1 tat protein.

Altered syndecan-1 expression has been detected in several different tumor types. Syndecan 1 can be a marker for plasma cells.

Structure 

The syndecan-1 core protein consists of an extracellular domain which can be substituted with heparan sulfate and chondroitin sulfate glycosaminoglycan chains, a highly conserved transmembrane domain, and a highly conserved cytoplasmic domain, which contains two constant regions that are separated by a variable region. The extracellular domain can be cleaved (shed) from the cell surface at a juxtamembrane site, converting the membrane-bound proteoglycan into a paracrine effector molecule with roles in wound repair  and invasive growth of cancer cells.

An exception is the prosecretory mitogen lacritin that binds syndecan-1 only after heparanase modification. Binding utilizes an enzyme-regulated 'off-on' switch in which active epithelial heparanase (HPSE) cleaves off heparan sulfate to expose a binding site in the N-terminal region of syndecan-1's core protein. Three SDC1 elements are required. (1) The heparanase-exposed hydrophobic sequence GAGAL that promotes the alpha helicity of lacritin's C-terminal amphipathic alpha helix form and likely binds to the hydrophobic face. (2) Heparanase-cleaved heparan sulfate that is 3-O sulfated. This likely interacts with the cationic face of lacritin's C-terminal amphipathic alpha helix. (3) An N-terminal chondroitin sulfate chain that also likely binds to the cationic face. Point mutagenesis of lacritin has narrowed the ligation site.

While several transcript variants may exist for this gene, the full-length natures of only two have been described to date. These two represent the major variants of this gene and encode the same protein.

Inflammation 
Syndecan-1 deficient mice show increased inflammation, which was attributed to an increased ICAM-1 and heparan sulfate-dependent recruitment of leukocytes (including neutrophils and dendritic cells) to the inflamed endothelium. This increase results in higher inflammatory responses and tissue damage in experimental models of contact dermatitis, inflammation of the kidney, myocardial infarction, inflammatory bowel disease and experimental autoimmune encephalomyelitis In experimental colitis-induced colon carcinoma, syndecan-1 deficiency promotes tumor growth in an IL-6 / STAT-signaling-dependent manner.

Clinical significance
Altered syndecan-1 expression has been detected in several different tumor types. In breast cancer, syndecan-1 is up regulated and contributes to the cancer stem cell phenotype, which is linked to increased resistance to chemotherapy and radiation therapy 

It is a specific antigen on multiple myeloma cells. Indatuximab ravtansine targets this protein.

Application 
It is a useful marker for plasma cells, but only if the cells tested are already known to be derived from blood. For plasma cells, it usually stains intensely membranous, with or without associated diffuse weak cytoplasmic and/or Golgi staining. Few cases show cytoplasmic granular staining, with or without associated Golgi staining.

References

Further reading 

 
 
 
 
 
 
 
 
 
 
 
 
 
 
 
 
 
 
 

Proteoglycans